Joe Vigil is an American track and field coach who specializes in long-distance running.

In 2015, he was the recipient of the Legend Coach Award from USA Track & Field.

Early life 

Born in Antonito, Colorado, Vigil moved to Alamosa, Colorado, where he attended high school.

After high school and a brief spell of two years in the United States Navy, Vigil attended Adams State College, as an undergraduate, then Colorado College for a master's degree before doing his doctorate at the University of New Mexico.

Coaching career 

Vigil started his coaching career at his old high school, Alamosa High School, before becoming coach at his old university, Adams State. There he taught from 1965 to 1993, taking the university to 19 national titles at track and field, and cross-country.

In 1997, Vigil was head coach of the United States Pan-American Games Team.

In 1998, Vigil was the long-distance running coach for the United States Olympics Team.

He was also coach for seven world cross country championships.

Achievements and accolades 

Vigil has a statue erected in his honour at Adams State University where he has also been granted the title of Professor Emeritus.

In 1991, Vigil was elected to the Colorado Sports Hall of Fame.

Vigil was elected to the National Association of Intercollegiate Athletics(NAIA) Hall of Fame.

In 2015, Vigil was awarded the accolade of USA Track & Field's Legend Coach award.

This follows on from his achievement of being National Coach of the year fourteen times. Among the many athletes he coached was Pat Porter (1959-2012), an American national track and field champion in the 10,000 meters (as well as in cross country), as well as a two-time Olympian on the U.S. track teams in 1984 and 1988.

Published in 2020, Chasing Excellence by Pat Melgares tells the story of Coach Vigil's life, coaching successes, and his Vigilosophy.

References 

People from Conejos County, Colorado
People from Alamosa, Colorado
Adams State University alumni
Colorado College alumni
University of New Mexico alumni
American Olympic coaches
American track and field coaches
Year of birth missing (living people)
Living people